Coptodryas is a genus of ambrosia beetles in the tribe Xyleborini (highly specialized weevils of the subfamily Scolytinae).

Species 
 Coptodryas abbreviata Wood & Bright, 1992
 Coptodryas alpha Wood & Bright, 1992
 Coptodryas amphicauda Bright & Skidmore, 1997
 Coptodryas artegrapha Wood & Bright, 1992
 Coptodryas atava Wood & Bright, 1992
 Coptodryas bella Wood & Bright, 1992
 Coptodryas borneensis Bright & Skidmore, 1997
 Coptodryas brunneus Bright & Skidmore, 1997
 Coptodryas camela Wood & Bright, 1992
 Coptodryas chimbui Wood & Bright, 1992
 Coptodryas chrysophylli Wood & Bright, 1992
 Coptodryas comptus Bright & Skidmore, 2002
 Coptodryas confusa Hopkins, 1915b
 Coptodryas corporaali Wood & Bright, 1992
 Coptodryas costipennis Wood & Bright, 1992
 Coptodryas curvidentis Wood & Bright, 1992
 Coptodryas cylindrica Wood & Bright, 1992
 Coptodryas destrictum Bright & Skidmore, 2002
 Coptodryas diversicolor Wood & Bright, 1992
 Coptodryas docta Wood & Bright, 1992
 Coptodryas elegans Wood & Bright, 1992
 Coptodryas erinacea Wood & Bright, 1992
 Coptodryas eucalyptica Wood & Bright, 1992
 Coptodryas exsculpta Wood & Bright, 1992
 Coptodryas extensa Wood & Bright, 1992
 Coptodryas gorontalosa Wood & Bright, 1992
 Coptodryas huangi Wood & Bright, 1992
 Coptodryas hylurgoides Schedl, 1948f
 Coptodryas intermedius Wood & Bright, 1992
 Coptodryas izuensis Wood & Bright, 1992
 Coptodryas judenkoi Wood & Bright, 1992
 Coptodryas kirishimanus Wood & Bright, 1992
 Coptodryas libra Wood & Bright, 1992
 Coptodryas muasi Bright & Skidmore, 1997
 Coptodryas mus Wood & Bright, 1992
 Coptodryas myllus Bright & Skidmore, 1997
 Coptodryas myristicae Wood & Bright, 1992
 Coptodryas nitellus Bright & Skidmore, 1997
 Coptodryas nudibrevis Wood & Bright, 1992
 Coptodryas nudipennis Wood & Bright, 1992
 Coptodryas nugax Wood & Bright, 1992
 Coptodryas obtusicollis Wood & Bright, 1992
 Coptodryas parva Wood & Bright, 1992
 Coptodryas pedella Wood & Bright, 1992
 Coptodryas perparva Wood & Bright, 1992
 Coptodryas pometianus Bright & Skidmore, 2002
 Coptodryas popondettae Bright & Skidmore, 1997
 Coptodryas pubipennis Wood & Bright, 1992
 Coptodryas pulla Wood & Bright, 1992
 Coptodryas punctipennis Wood & Bright, 1992
 Coptodryas quadricostata Wood & Bright, 1992
 Coptodryas recidens Wood & Bright, 1992
 Coptodryas rosseli Wood & Bright, 1992
 Coptodryas semistriatus Bright & Skidmore, 2002
 Coptodryas tenella Wood & Bright, 1992
 Coptodryas undulata Wood & Bright, 1992
 Coptodryas vafra Wood & Bright, 1992

References 

 Beaver, R.A. 2010: A review of the genus Hadrodemius Wood, with new synonymy and a key to species (Coleoptera: Curculionidae: Scolytinae). Zootaxa, 2444: 51–57

Footnotes 
 

 

Scolytinae
Curculionidae genera